Tolgay Ali Arslan (born August 16, 1990) is a professional footballer who plays as a midfielder for  club Udinese.

Born in Germany, he has Turkish ancestry. He represented both Germany and Turkey internationally at youth level.

Club career

Early career
Arslan was born and raised in Germany, in Paderborn, to Turkish parents from Çorum; his father, a real estate agent, moved to Germany when he was 11 years old. He began playing football at the age of six, when his father brought him along to watch Grün-Weiß Paderborn play. Arslan began his career with the local club. Patterning his game around Zinedine Zidane and Gheorghe Hagi, Arslan earned a move to Borussia Dortmund in 2003. After several years in Dortmund's youth team, Arslan moved to Hamburger SV.

Hamburger SV

Arslan moved to Hamburger SV on a free transfer in 2009. He made his debut on 23 September 2009, coming in the 70th minute as a substitute for Marcus Berg in the second round of the DFB-Pokal against Osnabrück. Hamburg managed a 3–3 draw, but went on to lose 5–7 following a penalty shootout. Arslan made his league debut on 17 October 2009 in a 0–0 draw against Bayer Leverkusen.

He moved on loan to Alemannia Aachen for the 2010–11 season and scored his first goal for the club in the fifth week of the 2. Bundesliga in a 3–1 win against FSV Frankfurt.

Beşiktaş
On 27 January 2015, Arslan signed a four-and-a-half-year deal with Süper Lig club Beşiktaş. He came on as a substitute for José Sosa on 26 February in the 60th minute of a UEFA Europa League last 32 second leg against Liverpool, and 15 minutes later scored the only goal of the game, taking it to a penalty shootout in which he scored Beşiktaş' last attempt before Dejan Lovren missed to eliminate Liverpool.

International career
Arslan began his career with the Turkey youth teams in 2009. He made two appearances for the U-19 team in 2009. He made his first appearance for the Turkey national under-21 football team against the Republic of Ireland on 7 September 2010.

In December 2010,  Arslan switched to the German Football Association. He was first called up to the Germany national under-21 team to face, of all teams, Turkey on 14 November 2012.

Personal life
In November 2018, it was decided that Arslan would perform his military service for Turkey in June 2019.

Career statistics

Club

Honours
Beşiktaş
Süper Lig: 2015–16, 2016–17

References

External links

 
 
 
 kicker profile

1990 births
Living people
Sportspeople from Paderborn
Footballers from North Rhine-Westphalia
German footballers
Germany youth international footballers
Germany under-21 international footballers
Turkish footballers
Turkey youth international footballers
Turkey under-21 international footballers
Association football midfielders
Borussia Dortmund players
Hamburger SV II players
Hamburger SV players
Alemannia Aachen players
Beşiktaş J.K. footballers
Fenerbahçe S.K. footballers
Udinese Calcio players
Bundesliga players
2. Bundesliga players
Süper Lig players
Serie A players
Expatriate footballers in Italy
German people of Turkish descent